This is a discography for British singer Petula Clark.

Studio albums

1950s

1960s

1970s

1990s–2018

Live albums

Charted compilations

EPs

–  The UK Pye Records / France Disques Vogue / U.S. Warner Bros. Records Years  –

The Monaural 7-inch 45rpm / 45 T(ours) EP remained the preferred format of French record buyers until 1968. Disques Vogue discontinued the format in 1970, around the time Petula Clark's recording contract expired. UK Pye Records discontinued the (N)EP series in 1968.

Singles 

* songs with lyrics not in English

Notes

A  "Natural Love" also peaked at #20 on the US Hot Country Singles & Tracks chart.
B  "Cut Copy Me" made #21 on the Belgian charts, and is currently Clark's most recent charting single in any territory.

References

External links
https://web.archive.org/web/20101127164904/http://petulaclark.net/discography.html official discography
https://web.archive.org/web/20160307080223/http://petulaclark.net/charts.html International Chart History

Discographies of British artists
Pop music discographies